Żakowo may refer to the following places in Poland:
 Żakowo, Greater Poland Voivodeship
 Żakowo, Pomeranian Voivodeship